Kildare Catholic College is an independent Roman Catholic co-educational secondary day school located in Wagga Wagga, New South Wales, Australia. Kildare Catholic College works with heritage links to Nano Nagle, the foundress of the Presentation Sisters and Edmund Rice, the founder of the Christian Brothers.

Overview
Kildare has seven houses, all of which are named after people of peace. Each house has its own colour. The six houses are as follows: Romero (Orange), King (Red), Teresa (Sky Blue), Gandhi (Navy Blue), Oodgeroo (Green), and Benedicta (Gold).

The school was established in 2004 as an amalgamation of three local schools:

 St Michael's High School
 Mount Erin High School
 Trinity Senior High School

Kildare Catholic College's sporting success in 2007 has been the best in the history of the school taking out the Byrnes Shield (Cricket), Hardy Shield (Rugby League), Carroll Cup (Australian Rules) and The Nic Henderson Shield (Rugby Union).

Since its founding in 2004 Kildare has performed seven musicals of a high standard. Its first musical was "Back to the 80s" in 2005 followed by "Godspell" in 2007, "Bye Bye Birdie" in 2009, "All Shook Up" in 2011 and "Joseph and the Amazing Technicolor Dreamcoat" in 2013. In 2015 they performed "High School Musical: On Stage". 2017 saw a reprise of "All Shook Up".

Accompanying these musical performances, Kildare Catholic College hosts an annual abridged Shakespeare production. 2018 hosted a production of "MacBeth". 2016's production was "Twelfth Night or What you Will". These productions are shortened to one act's length and provide an opportunity for senior drama students to perform in an open-audience context

College management
Chris Browne, Principal (2021-current)
Christie Scutti (Formerly Scoble), Assistant Principal (2021-current)

Previous Principals

Richard Sidorko (2020-2020)
Christie Scutti (Formerly Scoble) (2019-2020)
Rod Whelan (2013-2019)
Patricia Burgess, Foundation Principal (2004-2012)
Simon Huntly, Assistant Principal (-2017)

See also 

 List of schools in the Riverina
 List of Catholic schools in New South Wales

References

External links
 Kildare Catholic College website

Educational institutions established in 2004
Catholic secondary schools in New South Wales
Education in Wagga Wagga
2004 establishments in Australia
Roman Catholic Diocese of Wagga Wagga